Flaveria pringlei is a Mexican plant species of Flaveria within the family Asteraceae. It has been found only in central Mexico, in Guerrero, Puebla, and northwestern Oaxaca.

Description
One plant can produce many small flower heads in a densely packed array. Each head contains 7-9 yellow disc flowers but no visible ray flowers.

References

External links

pringlei
Endemic flora of Mexico
Plants described in 1918